Kristen Bicknell (born December 29, 1986) is a Canadian professional poker player.

Early life
Bicknell was born in St. Catharines, Ontario. She drew inspiration from professional poker player, Jennifer Harman, and regularly watched her on Poker After Dark.

Poker career
Bicknell began playing poker in her freshman year at college. She began playing online in 2006 under the alias krissyb24 (PokerStars) and krissy24 (Full Tilt Poker).

She hit Supernova Elite on PokerStars in 2011, 2012 and 2013. This required her to play approximately 2.5 million hands per year. She focused her online games at the $1/$2 to $2/$4 stakes. She calls herself the "Ultimate Grinder" for the volume of hands she plays online. In 2013, she won the $1,000 Ladies No Limit Hold'em Championship at the 2013 World Series of Poker earning $173,922.

In 2016, Bicknell won the $1,500 No-Limit hold'em bounty event and earned $290,768. That same year she signed with partypoker. In Aug 2021 Bicknell and partypoker parted ways no reason was given. Also in Aug 2021 Bicknell said she was going to boycott the WSOP, due to her anti-COVID-19 vaccine stance, other Twitter users pointed out you cannot boycott something where you do not meet the requirements

Bicknell was the highest ranked live tournament female poker player in 2017 with a total GPI points of 2,627.75. She ranked above Maria Lampropulos and Maria Ho. Her largest win of 2017 came in December's WPT Five Diamond Series at Bellagio. She triumphed with a 1st-place trophy in a $5,200 No-Limit Hold'Em event, outlasting a field of 147 for $199,840.

In January 2018, Bicknell appeared on Poker After Dark for a ladies only cash game titled "Femme Fatale" week. She went on to events in Australia and Uruguay, while winning the APPT National High Roller in Macau during March for $2,192,000 HKD (US$279,549). At the final table, she defeated David Peters heads up to top a field of 117, who all entered for $80,000 HKD each.

Bicknell continued success in 2019 with eight six-figure cashes for the year. The final of these came in November for $408,000 as part of the Poker Masters series with a 1st place win after going heads up with Chance Kornuth.  Her efforts contributed to finishing 2019 with a third straight GPI Ladies title (3175.37 points).

With the COVID-19 pandemic causing live poker tournaments to cease in most of 2020, Bicknell participated in several online poker series through the year.  She cashed nine times in the online Super High Roller Bowl series, including a $236,000 score with 3rd place in a $25,500 buy-in event.

Bicknell went on to win her third World Series of Poker bracelet as part of its 2020 online series with a $356,412 victory in the $2500 No Limit Hold'Em 6-Handed event.

As of March 2021, her total live tournament winnings exceed $5,188,000.

World Series of Poker

An "O" following a year denotes bracelet(s) won during the World Series of Poker Online

Personal life 
Bicknell is married to fellow professional poker player Alex Foxen.

References

External links

1986 births
Canadian poker players
World Series of Poker bracelet winners
Female poker players
Sportspeople from St. Catharines
Living people